William Randall (1823 – 17 February 1877) was an English cricketer.  Randall's batting style is unknown.  He was educated at Eton College.

Randall made a single first-class appearance for Sussex against Surrey at the Petworth Park New Ground in 1849.  In this match, Randall was run out for 3 runs in Sussex's first-innings.  He wasn't required to bat again as Sussex recorded a victory by an innings and 49 runs.

He died at Northchapel, Sussex on 17 February 1877.

References

External links
William Randall at ESPNcricinfo
William Randall at CricketArchive

1823 births
1877 deaths
People educated at Eton College
English cricketers
Sussex cricketers
People from Northchapel